Inquicus fellatus is an extinct, bowling pin-shaped worm from the Chengjiang Biota, in what was once a marine environment from Early Cambrian Yunnan province.  Its fossils are found attached to fossils of the worms Cricocosmia and Mafangscolex in either a parasitic or commensalistic relationship.

Description
Inquicus individuals were up to three centimeters long, shaped like a bowling pin with an elongated body that tapered to a slightly bulbous head. They attached their bottom ends to their hosts, with their feeding appendages facing outwards and away from their hosts' bodies.

Behavior
Although Inquicus attached to host worms, it is unlikely that the relationship was directly parasitic. The attachment point of Inquicus did not penetrate the skin of the hosts, but rather attached through suction. The species also was stiff, with there being no evidence that it could bend its mouth backwards to feed on the host. It is more likely that they simply rode on their hosts while browsing for food, or used them as a form of locomotion.

References

Maotianshan shales fossils
Enigmatic animal taxa
Fossil taxa described in 2017
Cambrian genus extinctions